Dee is an unincorporated community in Armstrong County, Pennsylvania, United States.

History
A post office called Dee was established in 1889 and remained in operation until 1901.

References

Unincorporated communities in Armstrong County, Pennsylvania
Unincorporated communities in Pennsylvania